The Alastaro Circuit is a racing circuit situated in Virttaa village in Loimaa, Finland. There are also "jokamiesluokka" (folkrace) and drag racing tracks in the same area.

The circuit is named after former municipality of Finland. It was merged to town of Loimaa in 2009.

Track info:

 Length: 
 Length of folkrace track: 
 Run: clockwise
 Width:

Lap records

The fastest official race lap records at the Alastaro Circuit are listed as:

References

External links 
Official Website

Motorsport venues in Finland
Drag racing venues in Europe
Loimaa
Buildings and structures in Southwest Finland